The Basòdino Glacier was a 1.5 km long glacier (2005) situated in the Lepontine Alps in the canton of Ticino in Switzerland. In 1973 it had an area of 2.31 km2. Its funeral, marking its inevitable demise, was held on the 12th of September, 2021.

See also
List of glaciers in Switzerland
Swiss Alps

References

External links
Swiss glacier monitoring network

Glaciers of Switzerland
Lepontine Alps